Aharbal is a hill station  in the south-western part of Kashmir Valley in the Indian union territory of Jammu and Kashmir, south of the summer capital of Srinagar (Sub district: Damhal Hanjipora, District: Kulgam). Aharbal Waterfall is also known as Niagara Waterfall of Kashmir.

Geography

Aharbal lies in the Kulgam district's Noorabad area of Jammu and Kashmir. It is located on the Veshu River, a tributary of the Jehlum River, in an alpine valley covered in pine and fir trees within the Pir Panjal mountains. It lies at an altitude of 2266 metres above sea level.

The road route is from Srinagar-Kulgam-Nehama-KB Pora-Aharbal Road.

Aharbal Fall

Aharbal is known for its waterfall, Aharbal Falls, where the Veshu falls noisily 25 metres and 7 metres through a narrow gorge of granite boulders. Aharbal Falls are also referred to as the Niagara Falls of Kashmir, owing to the volume of the water that falls. According to a report, the water volume would be sufficient to generate 100 MW of hydroelectricity. The terraces leading to the falls are fenced, but care must be taken to avoid slipping.

Aharbal Development Authority
The Aharbal Development Authority, a government agency responsible for development in Aharbal, has built tourist infrastructure including huts and a cafeteria, and other lodging and boarding facilities have also been made available. But still development issues are at the hill station like parks are not maintained properly, there is no amusement park like Lidder Amusement Park, littering, proper roads and parking issues.
The area is peaceful and the crime rate is very low. G

Oldest Fossil Site in J&K

The exact site which is barely 2 km from the famous Aharbal waterfall along the Kunghwatan route, experts believe that the site which is rich in fossil biodiversity and replete with dense fossil samples at specific locations can be as old as 488 to 354 million years. However, the exact date can be ascertained only after radiocarbon dating. Preliminary investigation it was revealed that the fossils fall between the Ordovician and Devonian period. “The different organisms of that period include bryozoans (colonial animals); gastropods, trilobites, ancestors of C scorpions, and ancient relatives of snails etc”. This recently ‘discovered’ fossil site at famous tourist destination Aharbal has been secured by the department of Archives, Archaeology and Museums.

Access

Aharbal falls in Noorabad sub division of District Kulgam and is easily accessible from Srinagar via Shopian [Bab-ul-Islam], only 8 km from the Mughal Road that connects Srinagar and Poonch. The 75 km drive takes less than 3 hours by car or bus via Pulwama and Shopian. An alternate route leads to Aharbal via Kulgam-Nehama-DH pora -Kb pora -Manzgam-Wattoo-Aharabal. It is only 22 km from the District Kulgam the first District one enters the Kashmir valley after crossing the Jawaharlal National Tunnel. The nearest railway station is Anantnag railway station at 44 km in the east.

See also

Chiranbal
Dal lake
Veshaw
 Sonamarg
 Gulmarg
 Pahalgam
 Yusmarg
 Kukernag
 Kausar Nag
Mughal Road
Sheikh ul-Alam International Airport
Hirpora Wildlife Sanctuary
Martand Sun Temple
 Kashmir Railway

References

External links

Cities and towns in Kulgam district
Hill stations in Jammu and Kashmir
Waterfalls of Jammu and Kashmir